Peter Triantis  is an Australian football (soccer) player who plays as a central midfielder for Bankstown City.

Club career

Youth career
Triantis' youth career began in 2009 at APIA Leichhardt Tigers before moving a year later to Sydney Olympic FC where he quickly forced his way into the First Grade squad. After amassing 49 games for Olympic and winning a title with them in the process, Peter was brought into the Sydney FC youth setup in 2012 under Brian Dene and impressed early in a pre-season youth tournament (2012 Vietnam Youth Cup) and then went on to play in the Sydney FC National Youth League squad.

Sydney FC
Triantis made his A-League debut for Sydney FC on 22 December 2012 against the Newcastle Jets, where he came on as a 30th-minute substitute for Brett Emerton. A week later, he made his first start for the team against the league-leading Central Coast Mariners where Sydney FC won 1–0. After being in and out of the team, Triantis received another start on 10 February 2013 where he scored his first goal for Sydney FC against Brisbane Roar. The goal gave Sydney FC a 2–1 lead and turned out to be the winning goal.

On 7 March 2013, Triantis signed a 2-year deal with Sydney FC and subsequently his first senior deal in professional football to take him through to the end of the 2014/15 A-League season with the club. At the start of the 2013/14 season, Triantis was ruled out for 4–5 months with osteitis pubis allowing Matt Thompson to sign as injury cover for the young midfielder.

Triantis was released from his contract at the conclusion of the 2014–15 season.

Honours
With Sydney United:
  Waratah Cup: 2016

Career statistics

Personal life
Peter is one of 10 children in his family. His older brother Chris Triantis is also a professional footballer, currently playing for Sydney Olympic in the New South Wales Premier League. Chris captained the championship winning Sydney FC youth team in 2008–09 before moving on to play three A-League games for the Newcastle Jets.
Attended Secondary School education at St Mary's Cathedral College, Sydney.

References

1992 births
Australian soccer players
Sydney FC players
Australian people of Greek descent
Association football midfielders
Living people
A-League Men players
National Premier Leagues players